Rubén Duarte Sánchez (born 18 October 1995) is a Spanish professional footballer who plays for Deportivo Alavés. Mainly a left-back, he can also play as a central defender.

Club career

Espanyol
Born in Almería, Andalusia, Duarte joined RCD Espanyol's youth system in 2009, aged 13, after spells at Los Molinos CF and Polideportivo Ejido. In 2012, he was linked to Manchester City, and made his senior debut with the reserves in the Segunda División B.

On 7 January 2015, Duarte made his first-team debut, playing the full 90 minutes in a 2–1 away loss against Valencia CF for that season's Copa del Rey. His maiden La Liga appearance occurred on 8 February, against the same opponent and with the same scoreline, but at the Estadi Cornellà-El Prat.

Duarte renewed his contract with the Catalan club on 11 June 2015, signing until 2019 and being promoted to the main squad.

Alavés
On 29 May 2017, after falling down the pecking order, Duarte signed a three-year deal at Deportivo Alavés in the same league. He played 24 matches in his first season, in a 14th-place finish.

Duarte scored his first goal in the Spanish top division – and as a professional – on 16 May 2021, in a 4–2 home win over Granada CF.

International career
After playing for Spain at under-16, under-17, under-18, under-19 and under-21 levels, Duarte was first called to the full side on 26 May 2015 for a friendly with Costa Rica and a UEFA Euro 2016 qualifying match against Belarus.

Career statistics

Club

References

External links
Espanyol official profile 

1995 births
Living people
Spanish footballers
Footballers from Almería
Association football defenders
La Liga players
Segunda División players
Segunda División B players
RCD Espanyol B footballers
RCD Espanyol footballers
Deportivo Alavés players
Spain youth international footballers
Spain under-21 international footballers